Dihydrochalcone (DHC) is the organic compound with the formula C6H5C(O)(CH2)2C6H5.  It is the reduced derivative of chalcone (C6H5C(O)(CH)2C6H5). It is white solid that is soluble in many organic solvents. Dihydrochalcone per se is often minor significance, but some derivatives occur in nature and have attracted attention as drugs.

Natural dihydrochalcones

 Aspalathin, a C-linked dihydrochalcone glucoside found in rooibos, a common herbal tea
 Naringin dihydrochalcone, an artificial sweetener derived from naringin
 Neohesperidin dihydrochalcone, an artificial sweetener derived from citrus
 Nothofagin, a C-linked phloretin glucoside found in rooibos
 Phloretin
 Isosalipurpurin

Dihydrochalcones (3′,5′-dihydroxy-2′,4′,6′-trimethoxydihydrochalcone (methyl linderone) and 2′-hydroxy-3′,4′,5′,6′-tetramethoxydihydrochalcone (dihydrokanakugiol) can be found in twigs of Lindera lucida.

References